was a legendary local ruler of Okinawa Island.

According to Ryukyu's official history, Okinawa was split into three polities during the reign of Tamagusuku. 
He was the third son of Eiji (r. 1309-1313), he was the fourth ruler of the Eiso dynasty.

Succeeding his father Eiji as paramount chief of Okinawa's territorial lords at the age of nineteen, Tamagusuku lacked the charisma and leadership skills to command respect and loyalty from those lords (the anji). A number of these lords rebelled, and the island of Okinawa came to be divided into three kingdoms. Tamagusuku, remaining in Urasoe, became the chief of Chūzan. His failure to institute reforms or innovations in governance is generally claimed as one of the causes of the fall of the dynasty, which ended with Tamagusuku's son and successor Seii.

The Aji of Ōzato fled south from Tamagusuku's capital at Urasoe and, along with his followers, became the King of Nanzan. The Lord of Nakijin, based some distance to the north, declared himself King of Hokuzan. He was succeeded by his only son Seii.

Notes

References
 Kerr, George H. (1965). Okinawa, the History of an Island People. Rutland, Vermont: C.E. Tuttle Co. OCLC  39242121
 Nussbaum, Louis-Frédéric. (2002).  Japan Encyclopedia. Cambridge: Harvard University Press. ; OCLC 48943301

1296 births
1336 deaths
Kings of Ryūkyū
14th-century Ryukyuan people
13th-century Ryukyuan people